Saboten (Japanese "cactus") is a Japanese rock band founded in Osaka in 1999. From 2004-2007 they were Sony Music Japan artists. Their song "Scenario" was used as the end theme to the anime Naruto.

Albums
Hi Rock Hi
No Rain No Rainbow
Circus
Islands	SRCL-6257	
Classic 2007 SRCL-6491
Saboten Rock EXCR-1006	
Green Hole 2010	BZCS-1072	
This is a pen! 2012 PINE-0020	
White Pool 2012	PINE-0024	
1億3千万人が選ぶSABOTEN傑作集 PINE-0028	
Master Peace 2015
Appearances on compilation albums
Junk 2 2002
Punk Rock Camp 2002
Punk JukeBox 2
The 青春 Punk Rock
Green Days 2003
E.V.Junkie	SRCL-5597/8 - 23 in Oricon album chart
京阪 Wave
Nagoya Chorus Live 友情編
Naruto Super Hits 2006-2008	VWC-7561/2	
Out of this World 4 SURCD-008	
Make Merry Christmas
QP Special Tribute

References

Japanese musical groups